Šarišské Sokolovce is a village and municipality in Sabinov District in the Prešov Region of north-eastern Slovakia.

Names and etymology
The former Slovak name Tolčemeš derives from Hungarian Tóth – Slav/Slovak and sólyom – a hawk (Slovak sokol). It was given its current official name in 1948.

History
The village was probably founded already in the 11th or the 12th century by Slovak falconers. In historical records the village was first mentioned in 1307.

Geography
The municipality lies at an altitude of 431 metres and covers an area of 12.268 km². It has a population of about 515 people.

References

External links
http://www.statistics.sk/mosmis/eng/run.html

Villages and municipalities in Sabinov District